Café of the Gate of Salvation is a non-denominational a cappella gospel choir based in Sydney. Formed by musical director Tony Backhouse they are named after a cafe in Istanbul. Their album A Window in Heaven was nominated  for ARIA Award for Best World Music Album.

The choir consists of men and women singing in four part harmonies (soprano, alto, tenor, bass) and has ranged in size from thirty to fifty members. Several founding members continue to perform with the choir.

Since the choir’s formation Café of the Gate of Salvation has made a commitment to share gospel music’s ability to contribute to social justice, spirituality, joy, respect and pride. Run as an artist collective the choir has performed at events and festivals across Australia and the USA and performed on the soundtrack of the Australian film Sweetie.

Discography

Albums

Awards and nominations

ARIA Music Awards
The ARIA Music Awards is an annual awards ceremony that recognises excellence, innovation, and achievement across all genres of Australian music. They commenced in 1987.

! 
|-
| 1996
| A Window in Heaven
| ARIA Award for Best World Music Album
| 
| 
|-

References

External links
Cafe of the Gate of Salvation

Australian vocal groups
Musical groups established in 1986
Musical groups from Sydney